Kalevi Aed, also known as Kalevi spordiplats or Kalevi staadion, was a multi-purpose stadium in Tallinn, Estonia. It was the home ground of Tallinna Kalev. Today, Viru Keskus lies on the site of the former stadium.

History 

The history of the Kalevi Aed starts in the 19th century, when the land was owned by Jakob Johann von Gonsior and was rented out to a singing organisation named "Lootus". In 1920, Lootus leaves the contract unextended and Kalev, who have been looking for a field to construct their stadium, takes advantage of the opportunity. On 10 June 1923, a new stadium is opened and one month later, the Estonia national football team debuts on the field, drawing 1–1 with Latvia in front of 4,000 spectators.

In the autumn of the same year, the 1923 Estonian Football Championship takes place. By the fate of the draw, Kalev faces their arch-rivals Sport in the semi-final and the highly anticipated match takes place in Kalev's new stadium Kalevi Aed. With tickets sold out, 5,000 spectators witness Kalev triumph against Sport 1–0. Kalev goes on to win the 1923 Championship. Until this day, the match holds the attendance record of the Estonian top-flight football.

In addition to football, Kalevi Aed was also used for track and field, bandy and other sporting events.

The stadium was demolished few years after World War II, in the latter part of the 1940s.

Estonia national team matches 
From 1923 to 1925, the stadium served as the home ground for the Estonia national football team and hosted eight official national team matches, until Kadriorg Stadium was opened in 1926.

Kalevi Aed on the map

References 

Football venues in Estonia
Sports venues in Tallinn
JK Tallinna Kalev
Sports venues completed in 1923
Demolished buildings and structures in Estonia
Former buildings and structures in Estonia